Perper may refer to:

Currencies
 Hyperpyron, Byzantine coin
 Ragusan perpera, currency of the historical Republic of Ragusa
 Serbian perper, Serbian currency under Tsar Dusan
 Montenegrin perper, Montenegrin currency at the beginning of the 20th century

People
 Joshua Perper (1932–2021, Bacău), Romanian-American forensic pathologist
 Iosif Perper (May 13, 1886, Arzis, Bessarabia - Dec 26, 1966, Moscow, Russia), Russian Editor and Journalist, the founder of the only Vegetarian Journal in Russia (January 1909 - May 1915)
 David Perper (born 1952), drummer

Other uses
 Perper (band), Montenegrin rock band
 Perper, Iran, a village in East Azerbaijan Province, Iran